CareFirst BlueCross BlueShield is a health insurance provider serving 3.5 million individuals and groups in Maryland and the Washington metropolitan area. It has dual headquarters in Baltimore, Maryland and Washington, D.C. It is a nonprofit organization and an independent licensee of the Blue Cross Blue Shield Association.

The company has a 75 percent market share in Maryland. It also serves more than 626,000 members in the Federal Employees Health Benefits Program.

History

The history of CareFirst BlueCross BlueShield can be traced back to 1934, when Group Hospitalization, Inc. was formed by a hospital association in Washington, D.C. In 1942, the company was sanctioned to use the Blue Cross service mark, and in 1951 became a full participating member of the Blue Cross system. In 1969, Maryland Hospital Service, Inc. (Blue Cross) and Maryland Medical Service (Blue Shield) changed their names to Maryland Blue Cross and Maryland Blue Shield. In 1998, the Maryland and District of Columbia companies merged to form CareFirst BlueCross BlueShield.

In July 2000, CareFirst announced that it was leaving the Medicare HMO marketplace at the end of the year. In 2001, Wellpoint (now Anthem) offered to acquire the company for $1.37 billion, including $119 million in bonuses to Carefirst executives. In 2003, the offer was rejected by the Maryland insurance commissioner.

In 2013, CareFirst partnered with Cognizant to provide its members with information access and management of health coverage via smartphones and tablets using mobile technology. In May 2015, the company announced that a cyber attack in June 2014 compromised the data of 1.1 million current and former members. The breach did not include Social Security numbers, medical claims, employment, credit card or financial information, and CareFirst subsequently blocked member access to these accounts and requested members create new user names and passwords.

During the COVID-19 pandemic, CareFirst contributed $8 million to organizations on the front lines for COVID-19 relief, recovery and equitable vaccination efforts for communities in the region of Maryland. The company also covered services that are medically necessary for any of their members that are diagnosed with COVID-19. In early 2021, the company began providing Medicaid and Medicare Advantage options to consumers. In 2021, CareFirst dedicated $10.5 million toward addressing the root causes of diabetes in certain regional communities. The company also launched Better Together, a public health campaign urging people to get COVID-19 vaccines. In October 2021, the company launched CloseKnit, a virtual primary care practice providing a variety of care services including behavioral health services and care coordination.

Management 
In 2018, Brian D. Pieninck was named Chief Executive Officer. In April 2021, CareFirst appointed Dr. Tich Changamire as its new Chief Medical Officer.

Partnerships 
In October 2019, CareFirst partnered with Halcyon, an incubator program, to financially support healthcare startups. In September 2020, the company partnered with MedStar Health to provide value-based health care to communities. In August 2021, the company collaborated with Pittsburgh, PA-based healthcare provider Highmark to offer a health insurance designed specifically for labor unions and members.

References

Financial services companies established in 1934
Companies based in Baltimore
Health insurance in the United States
Health maintenance organizations
Insurance companies of the United States
Members of Blue Cross Blue Shield Association
Medical and health organizations based in Maryland
1934 establishments in Washington, D.C.